List of radio stations in the Greater Accra region of Ghana in no particular order

See also
Media of Ghana
 List of newspapers in Ghana
 List of radio stations in Ghana
Telecommunications in Ghana
New Media in Ghana
National Communications Authority

References 

 
 
 
 
 
 

Greater Accra